Pyrocleptria naumanni is a species of moth of the family Noctuidae. It is only known from North-eastern Tibet.

External links
 Beschreibung einer bisher unbekannten Art aus der Gattung Pyrocleptria HAMPSON, 1903 (Lepidoptcra: Noctuidae, Heliothinae)

Heliothinae